"The Anthem" is a song of worship by Australian contemporary worship band Planetshakers. It was released on December 15, 2012, as the single from their live album, Limitless (2013). The song also appeared on the album on the Planetshakers Kids album Nothing Is Impossible (2013), on the album Nada Es Imposible (2014) and it also appears in the album All For Love (2008).  The song was written by Joth Hunt, Henry Seeley and Liz Webber. The song has been covered by a number of Christian music artists including Todd Dulaney, Travis Greene and Elevation Worship led by the worship singer Chris Brown. This song has been translated and interpreted in many evangelical churches around the world.

Commercial performance 
In May 2014, Planetshakers band receives an invitation from James Robinson of the American television program Life Today with James Robison to sing the song The Anthem live.
In October 2016, on invitation from Brian Johnson, the band visited Bethel Church in Redding, California where the band performed the song live.  Planetshakers on November 10, 2015 visited the church El Lugar de Su Presencia in Colombia to sing the song "El Himno" in Spanish.

Music videos
The official music video for the song was released on December 15, 2012 and has garnered over 11 million views as of April 2021.

Accolades
The song, "The Anthem", was No. 18 on the Worship Leaders Top 20 Songs of 2013 list. 

In 2016 the song "The Anthem" was nominated for the Dove Award Urban Worship Recorded Song Of The Year 2016 at the 47th Annual GMA Dove Awards.

Covers and renditions
The song has been covered by various Christian music artists from around the world, including Todd Dulaney, Travis Greene and Elevation Worship among other artists. It has been sung in churches around the world, and has been translated into many languages.

On March 26, 2013 Travis Greene released the single "The Anthem" from the album Faceless Noise and also from the album Intentional released on August 21, 2015.
On November 10, 2014, VaShawn Mitchell released the song "The Anthem" titled (Medley) from the album Unstoppable.
On April 15, 2016, Todd Dulaney released a rendition of "The Anthem" from the album A Worshipper's Heart and also from the album To Africa With Love released on March 15, 2019. The song entered the Billboard Hot Gospel Airplay chart on April 30, 2016 at No. 1, on the Gospel Digital Song Sales Chart at No. 3 and on the Hot Gospel Songs chart at No. 4.

Chart performance
The song "The Anthem"''''' also topped the corresponding gospel charts: the Billboard Hot Gospel Airplay chart, the Billboard Gospel Digital Song Sales chart, and the Billboard Hot Gospel Songs chart.

References

2012 singles
2012 songs
Christian songs
Gospel songs
Contemporary Christian songs
Songs written by Joth Hunt
Planetshakers songs
Planetshakers Ministries International singles